Wharf Real Estate Investment Company Limited (Wharf REIC) is a listed real estate portfolio company. It is a subsidiary of private company Wheelock & Co. (formerly listed), as well as a sister company of fellow listed company The Wharf (Holdings).

Wharf REIC owned a few shopping centres and commercial buildings in Hong Kong (via Wharf Estates Limited and other subsidiaries such as listed company Harbour Centre Development) and in Singapore (via Wharf Estates Singapore and subsidiaries), namely: Harbour City complex, Times Square, Wheelock House, Crawford House, The Murray, Plaza Hollywood, Wheelock Place, Scotts Square etc.

History
Wharf Real Estate Investment Company Limited (Wharf REIC) was formed as a spin-off of The Wharf (Holdings) in 2017. Before the spin off, in 2016, The Wharf also acquired Wheelock House from the parent company Wheelock & Co. and from the chairman Peter Woo, which the assets were later injected to the REIC.

In February 2018, Wharf REIC replaced The Wharf (Holdings) as the component of the blue chip index Hang Seng Index.

In December 2019, Wharf REIC acquired Wheelock Place and Scotts Square and the company Wheelock Properties (Singapore) from Wheelock & Co.

References

External links
 
 

Real estate companies of Hong Kong
Wheelock and Company
Companies listed on the Hong Kong Stock Exchange
Offshore companies of the Cayman Islands